Jasenice is a village and a municipality in the Zadar County, Croatia.

Demographics
In the 2011 census, there were 1,398 inhabitants in the municipality, of which 1,272 in Jasenice and 126 in Zaton Obrovački. In the 2001 census, 97% of the population were Croats.

Settlements 
The municipality consists of following settlements:
Jasenice
Maslenica
Rovanjska
Zaton Obrovački
Before 2014, there were only two settlements in the municipality; Jasenice and Zaton Obrovački. In 2014, the settlement of Jasenice was split into three new ones; Jasenice, Maslenica and Rovanjska.

Twin towns – sister cities

Jasenice is twinned with:
 Greve in Chianti, Italy

References

Municipalities of Croatia
Populated places in Zadar County